Hamilton Ward Sr. (July 3, 1829– December 28, 1898) was an American lawyer and politician who served as a judge on the Supreme Court of New York, the attorney general of New York, and a Republican member of the United States House of Representatives.

Education
He attended the common schools and was privately tutored. He studied law in Elmira, New York, was admitted to the bar.

Early career
He commenced legal practice in Philipsville in 1851.

Beginning in 1858 Ward was regularly selected as a delegate to New York's Republican state conventions, and he attended almost every one until 1890.

He was district attorney of Allegany County from 1856 to 1859 and again from 1862 to 1865. He was appointed in 1862 by the governor of New York as commissioner to raise and equip troops for the Civil War.

United States House of Representatives
Ward was elected as a Republican to the 39th, 40th and 41st United States Congresses, serving from March 4, 1865 to March 3, 1871. While a Representative, he was Chairman of the Committee on Revolutionary Claims (Fortieth Congress).

In 1868, Ward was on the seven-person committee tasked with authoring the articles of impeachment against President Andrew Johnson after Johnson was impeached.

Ward was not a candidate for renomination to the House in 1870.

Post-congressional career in New York State politics
Ward was attorney general of New York from 1880 to 1881, elected in 1879.

Ward was a delegate to the New York State Constitutional Convention of 1890, and was appointed (and subsequently elected) a justice of the New York Supreme Court and served from 1891 to 1895, and in the Appellate Division from 1895 until his death in 1898.

Personal life
Ward's son Hamilton Ward Jr. would go on to serve as attorney general of New York himself (1929–1930).

Ward was buried at the Forest Hill Cemetery in Belmont.

References

Sources

Obituary in the New York Times on December 29, 1898

External links
 Additional biographic material

1829 births
1898 deaths
People from Salisbury, Herkimer County, New York
People from Wellsville, New York
County district attorneys in New York (state)
New York State Attorneys General
New York Supreme Court Justices
Republican Party members of the United States House of Representatives from New York (state)
19th-century American politicians
19th-century American judges
Impeachment of Andrew Johnson